Henn-Ants Kurg (until 1935 Hans Kurg; 17 October 1898 – 31 July 1943) was an Estonian Colonel and a diplomat.

Early life 
Hans Kurg was born in Tallinn in 1898. Tõnu Kurg, his father, was  a merchant from Lehtse Parish, and Cäcilie Marie Aitian from Haljala. He studied at Tallinn Alexander Gymnasium in 1906–1916.

Later, after an unsuccessful operation in Tallinn, he died in a military hospital on 28 December 1943. He was buried on 4 January 1944, in Metsakalmistu, Tallinn.

Personal life
Hans Kurg married Marta Baumann in 1927, with whom he had two sons Peet-Rein (1928) and Ivo-Mart (1931).

Awards 
 French Croix de guerre (1919)
 Latvian Order of Lāčplēsis, V Class (1925)
 Finnish White Rose Class I Knight (1925)
 Estonian Order of the Cross of the Eagle, III Class (1936)
 German State Iron Cross I and II

References 

1898 births
1945 deaths
Estonian diplomats
Estonian military personnel
Estonian anti-communists
Estonian military personnel of the Estonian War of Independence
Estonian Waffen-SS personnel
Recipients of the Military Order of the Cross of the Eagle, Class III
Recipients of the Croix de Guerre (France)
Recipients of the Order of Lāčplēsis, 3rd class
Recipients of the Iron Cross (1939), 1st class
Recipients of the Iron Cross (1939), 2nd class
University of Tartu alumni
Burials at Metsakalmistu
People from Tallinn
German military personnel killed in World War II
Landmine victims
Waffen-SS personnel killed in action